The Bazaar Mosque, also known as Murad Bey mosque (Xhamia Muratbeu) or Varosh mosque (Xhamia e Varoshit), is a historic mosque in Krujë, Albania. It was built in 1533 and is a Cultural Monument of Albania today. It is situated in the historic bazaar of Kruje (the Derexhiku Bazaar), known as Akce Hisar in Ottoman times. Built by Ottoman Albanian beys, the mosque got closed during the Communist dictatorship and its typical minaret got torn down. The mosque was reopened in 1991.

During the renovation by the Turkish Cooperation and Coordination Agency (TIKA) in the 2010s, the antique ornate and interior painting of the Bazaar mosque got completely lost.

See also 
 Islam in Albania

References 

Ottoman architecture in Albania
Cultural Monuments of Albania
Mosques in Albania
Buildings and structures in Krujë
1533 establishments in the Ottoman Empire
Mosques completed in 1533
Tourist attractions in Durrës County